Helvécio Ratton (born May 14, 1949) is a Brazilian film director, producer and screenwriter.

Filmography
Criação (1978; short film)
Em Nome da Razão (1979; short film)
João Rosa (1980; short film)
Um Homem Público (1981; short film)
Cidadão Favelado (1982; short film)
A Dança dos Bonecos (1986)
Menino Maluquinho: O Filme (1995)
Pequenas Estórias (1996; short film)
Love and Co (1998)
Something in the Air (2002)
Baptism of Blood (2006)
Pequenas Histórias (2007)
O Segredo dos Diamantes (2014)

References

External links

1949 births
Brazilian film directors
Brazilian film producers
Brazilian screenwriters
Living people
People from Minas Gerais